Moser Glacier is a glacier flowing into Andvord Bay just southeast of Arago Glacier, on the west coast of Graham Land, Antarctica. It was charted by the Belgian Antarctic Expedition under Adrien de Gerlache, 1897–99, and was named by the UK Antarctic Place-Names Committee in 1960 for German physicist Ludwig F. Moser (1805–80), who in 1844 invented stereoscopic photography.

References

Glaciers of Danco Coast